Ogochukwu Frank Onyeka (born 1 January 1998) is a Nigerian professional footballer who plays as a midfielder for Premier League club Brentford and the Nigeria national team.

Club career

Midtjylland
After moving from Nigerian club FC Ebedei to cooperation club FC Midtjylland in Denmark in January 2016, Onyeka established himself as part of the club, and on 20 September 2017 he made his first-team debut in the Danish Cup in a 7–0 win over Greve Fodbold where he also scored. Onyeka went on to make his Danish Superliga debut for the club a few months later in the club's 2017–18 campaign in a match against AC Horsens on 9 February 2018. There, he also scored, and was a key part in the 2–0 win. Onyeka distinguished himself again in the next fixture, on 18 February, against the leading Superliga team from FC Copenhagen, where he scored his second league goal for the club at the right winger position as Midtjylland beat the capital side 3–1. He was subsequently praised by head coach Jess Thorup for his positional versatility and maturity.

Onyeka made his UEFA Champions League debut in the following season, in Midtjylland's qualifier against Astana FC on 24 July 2018.

Brentford
Onyeka signed for newly promoted Premier League side Brentford on 20 July 2021 for an undisclosed fee.

International career
Onyeka received his first call-up for the Nigeria national team on 22 September 2020 for the friendly matches against Algeria and Tunisia in Austria on 5 and 9 October 2020, respectively. He made his debut with the Nigeria national team in a friendly 1–0 loss to Algeria on 9 October 2020.

Career statistics

Club

International

Honours
FC Midtjylland
 Danish Superliga: 2017–18, 2019–20
 Danish Cup: 2018–19

References

External links
Profile at the Brentford F.C. website
 

1998 births
Living people
Nigerian footballers
Nigeria international footballers
Association football midfielders
Danish Superliga players
F.C. Ebedei players
FC Midtjylland players
Brentford F.C. players
Nigerian expatriate footballers
Nigerian expatriate sportspeople in Denmark
Expatriate men's footballers in Denmark
Nigerian expatriate sportspeople in England
Expatriate footballers in England
People from Maiduguri
Premier League players
2021 Africa Cup of Nations players